Huechys is a genus of cicada belonging to the family Cicadidae.

Species
The following species are recognized:
 Huechys aenea
 Huechys beata
 Huechys celebensis
 Huechys chantrainei
 Huechys chryselectra
 Huechys curvata
 Huechys dohertyi
 Huechys eos
 Huechys facialis
 Huechys fretensis
 Huechys funebris
 Huechys fusca
 Huechys haematica
 Huechys incarnata
 Huechys insularis
 Huechys lutulenta
 Huechys nigripennis
 Huechys parvula
 Huechys phaenicura
 Huechys pingenda
 Huechys sanguinea
 Huechys sumbana
 Huechys thoracica
 Huechys tonkinensis
 Huechys vidua

References

Taxa named by Charles Jean-Baptiste Amyot
Taxa named by Jean Guillaume Audinet-Serville
Cicadettini
Cicadidae genera